Bogi Takács (born 25 December 1983) is a Hungarian poet, writer, psycholinguist, editor, and translator. Takács is an intersex, agender, trans, Jewish writer who has written Torah-inspired Jewish-themed work, and uses e/em/eir/emself or they/them pronouns.

Career
Takács, who is disabled, has worked with a number of other writers on projects such as Disabled People Destroy. E has been published in Strange Horizons, Uncanny, Lightspeed, Clarkesworld, Publishers Weekly and Apex. E completed an undergraduate degree, two master's degrees, an MSc in Experimental and Cognitive Psychology, and an MA in Theoretical Linguistics, all from ELTE University of Budapest. E moved to the United States to complete further post-graduate work at the University of Iowa. E completed eir Ph.D at the University of Kansas in 2022.

Personal life
Takács currently resides in the United States. E is autistic, and so is eir child.

Projects 
Takács writes a blog titled "Bogi Reads the World" dedicated to reviewing speculative fiction by marginalized authors. The site was launched in October of 2016 and was most recently updated in January of 2022.

Awards and nominations
Winner of the Lambda Literary Award for Best Transgender Fiction for Transcendent 2: The Year's Best Transgender Speculative Fiction
Finalist for the Locus Award for Transcendent 2: The Year's Best Transgender Speculative Fiction
Finalist for the 2018 and 2019 Hugo Award for Best Fan Writer
Winner of the 2020 Hugo Award for Best Fan Writer
Nominee for the 2020 and 2021 Elgin Awards for Algorithmic Shapeshifting

Selected bibliography

Editor
 Transcendent 4: The Year's Best Transgender Speculative Fiction 2018 (Lethe Press, 2019)
 Transcendent 3: The Year's Best Transgender Speculative Fiction 2017 (Lethe Press, 2018)
 Transcendent 2: The Year's Best Transgender Speculative Fiction 2016 (Lethe Press, 2017)
 Inkscrawl (2015-2016)
 Stone Telling Magazine (2015) with R. B. Lemberg and Shweta Narayan

Novellas 
 Power to Yield - Clarkesworld Magazine , July 2020

Novelettes
 "The 1st Interspecies Solidarity Fair and Parade" (first published in Rebuilding Tomorrow edited by Tsana Dolichva, published by Twelfth Planet Press, 2020)
 "Empathic Mirroring" (part 1 of The Song of Spores serial, first published in Eyedolon edited by Scott Gable, published by Broken Eye Books, 2018)
 "Defend Hearth Position" (part 2 of The Song of Spores serial, first published in Eyedolon #2, edited by Scott Gable, published by Broken Eye Books, 2018)
 "The Souls of Those Gone Astray from the Path" (first published in Dracula: Rise of the Beast edited by David Thomas Moore, published by Abaddon Books, 2018)
 "Standing on the Floodbanks" (first published in GigaNotoSaurus edited by Rashida J. Smith, 2016)
 "Three Partitions" (first published in GigaNotoSaurus, edited by Ann Leckie, 2014)

Short story collection
 The Trans Space Octopus Congregation (Lethe Press, 2019)

Poetry collection 

 Algorithmic Shapeshifting (Aqueduct Press, 2019)

References

External links 
 
 
 Bogi Reads the World

Living people
21st-century Hungarian poets
Hungarian LGBT poets
Hungarian transgender people
Hungarian non-binary people
Lambda Literary Award winners
Transgender Jews
1983 births
Hungarian emigrants to the United States
Jewish American writers
21st-century American poets
Non-binary poets
Intersex non-binary people
Hugo Award-winning fan writers
Transgender non-binary people
Intersex writers
Transgender poets
People on the autism spectrum
21st-century American Jews
21st-century Hungarian LGBT people
Agender people